The Men's CIMB Kuala Lumpur Open Squash Championships 2013 is the men's edition of the 2013 Kuala Lumpur Open Squash Championships, which is a tournament of the PSA World Tour event International (Prize money : 50 000 $). The event took place in Kuala Lumpur in Malaysia from 28 March to 31 March. Karim Darwish won his second CIMB Kuala Lumpur Open trophy, beating Mohamed El Shorbagy in the final.

Prize money and ranking points
For 2013, the prize purse was $50,000. The prize money and points breakdown is as follows:

Seeds

Draw and results

See also
Women's Kuala Lumpur Open Squash Championships 2013
PSA World Tour 2013
Kuala Lumpur Open Squash Championships

References

External links
PSA CIMB Kuala Lumpur Open 2013 website
Kuala Lumpur Open 2013 official website
CIMB Kuala Lumpur Open 2013 Squashsite website

Squash tournaments in Malaysia
Kuala Lumpur Open Squash Championships
2013 in Malaysian sport